OffOn is an experimental film created by Scott Bartlett made and released in 1968.

Summary
It is most notable for being one of the first examples in which film and video technologies were combined.  The nine-minute film combines a number of video loops which have been altered through re-photography or video colorization, and utilizes an electronic sound track to create its unique effect.

Legacy
In 2004, the film was selected for preservation in the United States National Film Registry by the Library of Congress as being "culturally, historically, or aesthetically significant".

It also appeared on the 1990 Oscar-nominated documentary film Berkeley in the Sixties.

In 1980, Scott recreated the event in a video production class at UCLA called The Making of OffOn.

See also
Counterculture of the 1960s
Television production
Psychedelia

References

External links
OffOn essay by Scott Simmon on the National Film Registry website

 
 Synopsis and discussion of OffOn.
 OffOn on Underground Film Journal
 OffOn on National Film Preservation Foundation
 OffOn essay by Daniel Eagan in America's Film Legacy: The Authoritative Guide to the Landmark Movies in the National Film Registry, A&C Black, 2010 , pages 643-644 

1968 films
United States National Film Registry films
American short films
1960s avant-garde and experimental films
1968 short films